José Mouzinho d'Albuquerque (27 December 1885 – 8 August 1965) was a Portuguese horse rider. He competed in the 1924 Summer Olympics and in the 1928 Summer Olympics.

In 1924, Mouzinho and his horse Hetrugo won the bronze medal as part of the Portuguese show jumping team, after finishing 17th in the individual jumping competition. Four years later, he and his horse Hebraico finished sixth as part of the Portuguese show jumping team, after finishing 19th in the individual jumping competition.

References

External links
profile

1885 births
1965 deaths
Portuguese male equestrians
Show jumping riders
Olympic equestrians of Portugal
Equestrians at the 1924 Summer Olympics
Equestrians at the 1928 Summer Olympics
Olympic bronze medalists for Portugal
Olympic medalists in equestrian
Sportspeople from Porto
Medalists at the 1924 Summer Olympics